The 2021 Sun Belt women's basketball tournament was the postseason women's basketball tournament for the Sun Belt Conference that took place March 5–8, 2021, at the Pensacola Bay Center for majority of the games and a few First round and Quarterfinal matchups at Hartsell Arena on the campus of Pensacola State College, both in Pensacola, Florida. All games were broadcast on ESPN+, and the championship game was televised on ESPNU.

Format
All 12 teams were eligible for the tournament. Seeding was decided by divisions – the top two teams with the best overall conference records in each division received first-round byes. The remaining seeds were determined based on division finish. In the event of a tie for a particular seed, the seed was determined within each division.

The #1 seeds of each division faced the winner of the game between the #4 seed from the opposite division and the #5 seed from the team's same division in the quarterfinal round. Similarly, the #2 seeds of each division faced the winner of the #3 seed from the opposite division and the #6 seed from the same division. The semifinal round featured the winner of the #1 seeds' quarterfinal games against the winner of the game featuring the #2 seeds from the opposite division.

Seeds

Schedule

*Game times in Eastern Time. #Rankings denote tournament seeding.

Bracket

References

Tournament
Sun Belt Conference women's basketball tournament
Sun Belt Conference women's basketball tournament
Sun Belt Conference women's basketball tournament